Janni Olsson (born 22 March 1985) is a Swedish TV host, model, actress and outdoor columnist. She is best known for her appearances on Japanese television shows such as Trails to Oishii Tokyo(former Trails to Tsukiji), J-Trip Plan, Tokyo Eye 2020, and Journeys in Japan of NHK World-Japan. Olsson plays the character Alena Treasurehunter in the Amazon Prime Video series The Benza and its spin-off series Benza English and the video game The Benza RPG.  

She additionally works as an outdoor journalist in Japan, being featured in major magazines such as BE-PAL, PEAKS and GARVY.

Career 

Olsson started out in the entertainment industry as a costumed character at a theme park in Sweden, where she worked for 10 years. Her modeling career started when she was scouted during her time as an exchange student studying at Gakugei University in Tokyo.

Her breakthrough came when she first appeared on the Japanese TV show Trails to Oishii Tokyo (formerly: Trails to Tsukiji). She then went on to appear on several Japanese travel programs.

In 2018, she joined the independent production company Tokyo Cowboys, on the web drama ”The Benza” as ”Alena”. The following year, she won Best Supporting Actress at the Seoul Webfest 2019 for her performance.

Personal life 

Olsson is from Gothenburg, Sweden. As a child, she frequently went camping, horseback riding, and canoeing. Her interest in the outdoors led her to take classes involving outdoor survival skills including an intensive survival course at Bushcraft Denmark. Olsson is also a certified onsen sommelier.

After graduating high school, Olsson took a five week trip touring Japan with her brother. It was during this time that she realized she would like to live in Japan.

On her days off, she enjoys climbing mountains, hiking and canoeing. She also enjoys sports such as bouldering and cycling. She additionally spent thirteen years practicing Wing Chun.

Her passion for the outdoors led her to having her own columns in magazines such as BE-PAL and GARVY. She writes about both the Japanese and the Scandinavian outdoor scene, earning her the nickname ”The Swedish Outdoor Girl” (sueeden no autodoa gaaru）in Japanese media.

Filmography

Television

Video Games

Awards

References

External links

1985 births
Living people
Expatriate television personalities in Japan
21st-century Swedish actresses
Swedish television actresses
Swedish female models
Swedish journalists